Maurice Gordon Clarke (May 2, 1877 – June 5, 1944) was an American football and baseball player and coach. The Omaha, Nebraska native served as head football coach at the University of Texas at Austin in 1899, at Western Reserve University—now a part of Case Western Reserve University—in 1900, and at Washington University in St. Louis, compiling a career college football record of 15–8–3.  He was also the head baseball coach at Texas in the spring of 1900, tallying a mark of 14–2–1. 

Clarke was a graduate of the University of Chicago and played quarterback for the Chicago Maroons from 1896 to 1898 teams under Amos Alonzo Stagg.  He also lettered in baseball at Chicago.

Personal life
Clarke was born May 2, 1877, in Bellevue, Nebraska, to Henry T. Clarke Sr. and Martha A. Fielding Clarke, and had many siblings, including player, coach Henry T. Clarke Jr. 

Clarke later went into the oil business in Okmulgee, Oklahoma. He died there on June 5, 1944.

Head coaching record

Football

Baseball

References

External links
 

1877 births
1944 deaths
Year of death missing
19th-century players of American football
American football halfbacks
American football quarterbacks
Case Western Spartans football coaches
Chicago Maroons baseball players
Chicago Maroons football players
Texas Longhorns baseball coaches
Texas Longhorns football coaches
Washington University Bears football coaches
People from Bellevue, Nebraska
Sportspeople from Omaha, Nebraska
Coaches of American football from Nebraska
Players of American football from Nebraska
Baseball coaches from Nebraska